The Entomologist's Record and Journal of Variation is a bimonthly peer-reviewed entomological journal. Its emphasis is British and European Lepidoptera, but material on other insect orders is also published regularly. It was established by J. W. Tutt in 1890. Its current editor is Colin W. Plant.
Two long-running series featured in the journal are the annual reports on immigration of Lepidoptera into the British Isles, and an annual review of the Microlepidoptera recorded from Britain. The Entomologist's Record and Journal of Variation became a publication of the Amateur Entomologists' Society in January 2009.

External links 
 
 Amateur Entomologists' Society
 News announcement regarding the change in publisher

Entomology journals and magazines
Bimonthly journals
English-language journals
Publications established in 1890
Academic journals published by learned and professional societies of the United Kingdom